2021 Astana Open – Singles may refer to:

 2021 Astana Open – Men's Singles
 2021 Astana Open – Women's Singles